Kareena Kapoor is an Indian actress who has appeared in over 60 Hindi films. Kapoor made her acting debut opposite Abhishek Bachchan in the 2000 drama Refugee, for which she earned a Filmfare Award for Best Female Debut. The following year, she appeared in five films, including the romance Mujhe Kucch Kehna Hai, the thriller Ajnabee, and the ensemble melodrama Kabhi Khushi Kabhie Gham.... The latter emerged as the highest-grossing Bollywood film in overseas market to that point, and the success of these films established her in Bollywood. However, she followed it with a series of critical and commercial failures.

In 2004, Kapoor portrayed a prostitute in the 2004 drama Chameli, which proved to be a turning point in her career, earning her a Special Performance Award at Filmfare. That same year, she played a Muslim woman affected by the 2002 Gujarat riots in Govind Nihalani's political drama Dev, and two years later, she played the Desdemona character in Omkara (2006), an adaptation of William Shakespeare's tragedy Othello from director Vishal Bhardwaj. She won two Filmfare Critics Award for Best Actress for these films. In 2007, Kapoor played a loquacious Sikh girl in Jab We Met, a commercially successful romantic comedy-drama co-starring Shahid Kapoor, for which she won the Filmfare Award for Best Actress.

In 2009, Kapoor co-starred with Aamir Khan in Rajkumar Hirani's comedy-drama 3 Idiots, which emerged as the highest-grossing Indian film to that point. In 2010, she won the Filmfare Award for Best Supporting Actress for her role in the family drama We Are Family and played a tomboy in the lucrative comedy Golmaal 3. In 2011, she played the leading lady in the top-grossing action films Bodyguard and Ra.One. Among her four releases in 2012, she received praise for playing a free-spirited hairdresser in the romantic comedy Ek Main Aur Ekk Tu, a troubled actress in Heroine and a prostitute in Talaash: The Answer Lies Within. Following an appearance in the poorly-received romance Gori Tere Pyaar Mein (2013), Kapoor decreased her workload for the next two years, taking on smaller parts of the love-interest in the androcentric films Singham Returns (2014) and Bajrangi Bhaijaan (2015); the latter ranks among Indian cinema's highest earners. This changed in 2016 when she starred in two commercial successes, the satire Ki & Ka and the acclaimed social drama Udta Punjab. In 2018, Kapoor had a leading role in the female buddy film Veere Di Wedding, which ranks among the highest-grossing female-led Hindi films.

Film

Documentary

Television

See also
 Awards and nominations received by Kareena Kapoor Khan

Notes

References

Bibliography

External links
 

Indian filmographies
Actress filmographies